Sheepherders Junction   is a community in the Canadian province of Nova Scotia, located in  Colchester County in the Stewiacke Valley.
It is located at the border between Colchester County and Pictou County, Nova Scotia at the intersection of Dryden Lake Road with Route 289. Nearby on Fall Brook, a tributary of the Stewiake River, is the 12 m Fall Brook Fall.

Navigator

References
Sheepherders Junction on Destination Nova Scotia

Communities in Colchester County
General Service Areas in Nova Scotia